The Center for Architecture, Science and Ecology (CASE) is a research facility of the Rensselaer Polytechnic Institute (RPI). It is a joint project of RPI and architecture firm Skidmore, Owings and Merrill (SOM). It is located SOM's Wall Street offices in Lower Manhattan.

References

External links 
Center for Architecture, Science and Ecology webpage

Rensselaer Polytechnic Institute